Novokarazirikovo (Yañı Qarayerek) is a rural locality (a village) in Chekmagushevsky District, Bashkortostan, Russia. The population was 1 as of 2010. There is 1 street.

Geography 
Novokarazirikovo is located 27 km north of Chekmagush (the district's administrative centre) by road. Karazirikovo is the nearest rural locality.

References 

Rural localities in Chekmagushevsky District